The flag of the Empire of Manchuria had a yellow field with four horizontal stripes of different colours in the upper-left corner. The colours of the flag were based on the colours on the Five Races Under One Union flags used by the Beiyang government, Empire of China and by the Fengtian clique. The flag was first established in Announcement of National Flag on 1 March 1932.

Description
According to the Document of the Explanation of National Flag issued by state council of Manchukuo on 24 February 1933, the colours on the flag represent the four directions and center. The Study of Manchukuo National Flag published by state council of Manchukuo later also gave a representative based on Wu Xing.
 
 Yellow represents the center, symbolizes the rule of emperor of four directions and virtue of Ren in Confucianism, also Earth in Five Elements.
 Red represents the South, symbolises passion and courage, also Fire in Five Elements.
 Blue represents the East, symbolises youthfulness and holiness, also Wood in Five Elements.
 White represents the West, symbolises purity and justice, also Gold in Five Elements.
 Black represents the North, symbolises will and determination, also Water in Five Elements.

The colours also represent the five major peoples in Manchukuo:

 Yellow represents the Manchu people.
 Red represents the Japanese (Yamato) people.
 Blue represents the Han Chinese.
 White represents the Mongol people.
 Black represents the Korean people.

Manchukuo naval rank flags are similar in design to those of Soviet Navy but retained Manchukuo national colours.

Other Manchukuo flags

Navy of Manchukuo

1932–1935

1935–1941

Coast Guard

Marine Police

Postal flag

Political organization

Boy Scouts of Manchukuo

South Manchuria Railway Company

See also
 Imperial Seal of Manchukuo
 List of Chinese flags

References

External links
Flags of the World – Manchukuo (Japanese Puppet State in China)

Obsolete national flags
Manchukuo
Flags of China
Flags of Manchukuo